Nicola Lancini (born 29 March 1994) is an Italian footballer who plays as a defender for Serie D club Real Calepina.

Club career
On 2 September 2013, he was signed by Venezia on a one-year loan.

On 14 November 2019, he signed a contract with Serie C club Fermana until the end of the 2019–20 season.

On 2 September 2021, he moved to Casatese in Serie D.

On 30 December 2021, he joined to Serie D club Sangiuliano City.

References

External links

gazzetta.it 

1994 births
Living people
Sportspeople from the Metropolitan City of Turin
Footballers from Piedmont
Italian footballers
Association football defenders
Serie B players
Serie C players
Serie D players
Brescia Calcio players
Venezia F.C. players
Carrarese Calcio players
Bassano Virtus 55 S.T. players
S.S. Fidelis Andria 1928 players
Virtus Verona players
Fermana F.C. players
A.C. Mestre players
Cavese 1919 players
F.C. Sangiuliano City players
Italy youth international footballers